Stones is a surname. Notable people with the surname include:

Craig Stones (born 1980), English footballer
David Stones (born 1988), American musician
Dwight Stones (born 1953), American high jumper and television commentator
E. L. G. Stones (born 1914), British historian of the Middle Ages
John Stones (born 1994), English footballer
Margaret Stones (born 1920), Australian botanical illustrator
Tad Stones (born c. 1952), American animator, screenwriter, producer and director

See also
Stone (surname)
Stones (disambiguation)